The following outline is provided as an overview of and topical guide to poker:

Poker – family of card games that share betting rules and usually (but not always) hand rankings. Poker games differ in how the cards are dealt, how hands may be formed, whether the high or low hand wins the pot in a showdown (in some games, the pot is split between the high and low hands), limits on bet sizes, and how many rounds of betting are allowed.

Nature of poker 

Poker can be described as all of the following:

 Game – structured playing, usually undertaken for enjoyment and sometimes used as an educational tool. Games are distinct from work, which is usually carried out for remuneration, and from art, which is more often an expression of aesthetic or ideological elements. However, the distinction is not clear-cut, and many games are also considered to be work (such as professional players of spectator sports/games) or art (such as jigsaw puzzles or games involving an artistic layout such as Mahjong, solitaire, or some video games).
 Card game
 Sport – an organized, competitive, entertaining, and skillful activity requiring commitment, strategy, and fair play, in which a winner can be defined by objective means. It is governed by a set of rules or customs.
 Mind sport – a game where the outcome is determined

Equipment of the game 

 Playing cards
 Poker chips

Rules of the game 

 Betting in poker
 Public cardroom rules
 Cheating in poker

Poker hands 

List of poker hands
 Rank of hands
 Standard poker hands
 Straight flush
 Four of a kind
 Full house
 Flush
 Straight
 Three of a kind
 Two pair
 One pair
 High card
 Non-standard poker hands

Poker variations 

List of poker variants
 Draw poker (including five-card draw)
 Stud poker (including five-card stud and seven-card stud)
 Community card poker (including Texas hold 'em and Omaha hold 'em)
 Casino games with poker-like rules (including Caribbean stud and Pai Gow poker)
 Three card poker (including three card brag)
 Four card poker
 Chinese poker
 Non-standard poker hands

Game play 

 Poker tools

Poker strategy 

Poker strategy
 Fundamental theorem of poker
 Morton's theorem
 Pot odds
 Other gameplay and strategy

Poker plays 

 Aggressive plays –
 Bluff –
 Check-raise –
 Draw –
 Isolation –
 Position plays –
 Protection plays –
 Slow plays –
 Steal –

Poker probability 

Poker probability
 Poker probability (Texas hold 'em)
 Poker probability (Omaha)
 Poker probability (Seven-Card Stud)

Poker psychology 

Poker psychology
  Tells

Poker venues 

 Online poker –
 Casino –
 Card room –

Organized poker 
 Tournaments
 World Series of Poker
 World Poker Tour
 Other notable tournaments

History of poker 

History of poker
 Poker boom

General poker concepts 

 Glossary of poker terms
 List of playing-card nicknames
 Casino token
 Poker jargon

Poker personalities 
 Notable poker players

Related games 
 Poker-related games include:
 Non-poker vying games commonly played along with poker such as:
 Seven twenty-seven
 Bourré
 Unrelated games that use poker hands in various ways, such as:
 Liar's poker

See also 

 :Category:Poker companies
 :Category:Television shows about poker
 Dogs Playing Poker

References 
 Lordcasino Giriş

External links 

 

Poker
Poker